Linear heat detection (LHD) (also known as linear detection wire or linear heat detection cable or linear heat) is a very commonly used method of fire detection. It can detect a fire anywhere along the length of the cable, and can be of lengths in excess of a kilometer.

Applications can range from building fire alarm systems to mobile plant machinery.

Operation 
Linear heat detection (LHD) cable is essentially a two-core cable terminated by an end-of-line resistor (resistance varies with application). The two cores are separated by a polymer plastic, that is designed to melt at a specific temperature (commonly 68 °C for building applications), and without which causes the two cores to short. This can be seen as a change in resistance in the wire.

There are a limited states the LHD cable can be in:
 Open-circuit - effectively an infinite resistance
 Normal operating condition - apparent resistance will be the same as the end-of-line resistor
 Fire detection - resistance of the linear heat cable to the short circuit

See also
 Automatic fire suppression
 Distributed temperature sensing for linear heat detection using optical fibers
 Fire alarm

References

Active fire protection
Safety equipment
Fire detection and alarm
Detectors